Boomer is the nickname of:

 Bobby Baun (born 1936), Canadian retired National Hockey League player
 Chris Berman (born 1955), American sportscaster
 Ron Blomberg (born 1948), American former Major League Baseball player 
 Boomer Castleman, American singer-songwriter and guitarist
 Boomer Esiason (born 1961), American former National Football League quarterback
 Boomer Grigsby (born 1981), American football fullback
 Jerry Groom (1929–2008), American football player
 Wilfred "Boomer" Harding (1915–1991), Canadian multi-sport athlete
 Brent Harvey (born 1978), Australian rules footballer
 Charles Nicholl (1870–1939), Welsh rugby union player
 George Scott (first baseman) (1944–2013), American Major League Baseball player
 Vince Scott (1925–1992), Canadian football player
 John Dickson Stufflebeem (born 1952), retired US Navy vice admiral
 George Anthony Walkem (1834–1908), Canadian politician and jurist
 David Wells (born 1963), American former Major League Baseball pitcher
 Greg Wells (baseball) (born 1954), American former Major League Baseball player

See also 

 
 

Lists of people by nickname